The Montseny brook newt (Calotriton arnoldi) is a species of salamander in the family Salamandridae. It is endemic to the Montseny Massif (Catalan Pre-Coastal Range) in northeast Spain. Before it was formally described in 2005, it was mixed with the larger and more widely distributed Pyrenean brook salamander (Calotriton asper, formerly Euproctus asper).

Description
Montseny brook newt males measure  and females  in snout–vent length. Dorsum is dark, chocolate-coloured. Head is strongly flattened. Body is oval in cross-section and with some dorsoventral compression.

When handled, Montseny brook newts release a whitish, noxious, sticky, and very odorous skin secretion. This is probably a defence mechanism against predators.

Habitat and conservation
Its natural habitats are oligotrophic, cold (under 15 °C) fast running rivers; it seems to be a strictly aquatic species. Its population is supposed to be less than 1,500 individuals with an estimated rate of decline of 15% during the last 10 years. The drying out of mountain streams, human alteration of its original habitat and the global warming are threats to this species. Because of this, the International Union for Conservation of Nature (IUCN) lists it as "critically endangered".

References

External links

Newts
Endemic amphibians of the Iberian Peninsula
Endemic fauna of Spain
Critically endangered animals
Critically endangered biota of Europe
Taxa named by Salvador Carranza
Amphibians described in 2005